Wyler is a village along the Dutch-German border, 7 km southeast of Nijmegen, Gelderland, The Netherlands, and 5 km west of Kranenburg, Germany.

Location and population

Most of the village is located in the municipality of Kranenburg, North Rhine-Westphalia, Germany. A small part of it lies in the municipality of Berg en Dal, Gelderland, The Netherlands, a few kilometers from the city of Nijmegen (German: Nimwegen). 

The westernmost villages in the municipality of Kranenburg to some extent function as a dormitories for people who work in the Dutch city of Nijmegen.

Population is 525; 441 in the German part, and 84 in the Dutch part.

Proximity of Wylerberg

Some of the fiercest fighting towards the close of World War II occurred in the vicinity. Wyler lies close to the Wylerberg (Dutch: Duivelsberg; in World War II, known to Allied forces as 'Hill 75.9'), a hill which was formerly in Germany but, together with other territories — subsequently returned — annexed to The Netherlands after World War II.

Significant building

Among significant buildings in Wyler is the Sankt-Johannes-Kirche.

See also

 Kranenburg, North Rhine-Westphalia#Towns and villages in the municipality
 Kleve (district)#Towns and municipalities
 Zyfflich#Location
 Berg en Dal (municipality)#Population centres
 Duivelsberg#Location
 Nijmegen#Proximity of border with Germany
 Dutch annexation of German territory after World War II#Return
 Marinus van der Goes van Naters#German border issues after WW2

References

Populated places in Gelderland
Villages in North Rhine-Westphalia
Geography of Berg en Dal (municipality)
Kleve (district)